Count John Louis II of Nassau-Wiesbaden-Idstein (born: 21 May 1596; died: 9 June 1605 at Dillenburg) was the youngest and only surviving son of John Louis I and Maria of Nassau-Dillenburg.  He was only a few weeks old when his father died and he inherited Nassau-Wiesbaden and Nassau-Idstein.  However, he died when he was nine years old.  With his death, the Nassau-Wiesbaden-Idstein line died out.  Wiesbaden and Idstein fell back to Nassau-Weilburg, thereby reuniting all the territories of the Nassau-Walram ΙΙ line in one hand.

Counts of Nassau
16th-century German people
17th-century German people
House of Nassau
1596 births
1605 deaths
Counts of Nassau-Wiesbaden-Idstein